Harbor Freight Tools, commonly referred to as Harbor Freight, is a privately held tool and equipment retailer, headquartered in Calabasas, California, United States. It operates a chain of retail stores, as well as an e-commerce business. The company employs over 25,000 people in the United States, and has over 1,300 locations in 48 states.

History 
In 1977, Eric Smidt and his father, Allan Smidt, started Harbor Freight and Salvage in a small building in North Hollywood, California. The company began as a mail order tool business that dealt with liquidated and returned merchandise. As the business grew, its name was changed to Harbor Freight Tools. In 1985, Eric Smidt was named president of the company at age 25; he served under that title until 1999, when he became chief executive officer. From the mid-1980s to 2010 Harbor Freight was headquartered in nearby Camarillo, California.

Retail stores 

In 1980, Harbor Freight Tools opened its first retail store in Lexington, Kentucky, to sell returned merchandise from its mail order business. The original location was at 1387 East New Circle Road. It later moved to 1301 Winchester Road, Suite 213. The venture proved successful, and Harbor Freight Tools began to open stores across the United States. As of 2022, Harbor Freight Tools operates over 1,300 retail stores in 48 states.

Exclusive brands 
Harbor Freight sells many tools under in-house brands, sourced directly from manufacturers. These include:
 Bauer
 Central Pneumatic
 Chicago Electric
 Daytona
 Drill Master
 Hercules
 Icon
 Predator
 Pittsburgh and Pittsburgh Pro
 Quinn
 Titanium
 U.S. General
 Warrior

Quality assurance 
Harbor Freight tests their tools in their own quality assurance facility located in Camarillo, California.

Website 
Harbor Freight's website went online in 1997. It had a modest catalog of products, a brief "About Us" section and an order form for the printed catalog. There were also links to a customer service page with delivery times and return policies. In all, the original site had 10 landing pages. The  Harbor Freight website has over 79,000 indexed pages. The Harbor Freight website had over 31 million monthly visits as of 2023, mostly within the United States, according to Similarweb. They now also have a cell phone app.

Corporate affairs 

Harbor Freight Tools is headquartered in Calabasas, California. Harbor Freight has distribution space in Camarillo, California, Moreno Valley, California, Dillon, South Carolina, and Joliet, Illinois newly opened. It closed a distribution facility in Oxnard, California, in early 2013.

On April 4, 2013, Harbor Freight Tools announced a $75 million expansion project for the Dillon distribution center, which opened on November 22, 2015, adding 1 million square feet to the facility and 200 new jobs.

In 2022, Harbor Freight Tools opened a distribution center in Joliet, Illinois, spanning 1.6 million square feet in size and creating 800 new jobs.

Investor relations 
In 2012, Harbor Freight, through Credit Suisse, secured a $750 million loan to refinance existing debt and fund a dividend for the company's private shareholders.

Philanthropy 
Harbor Freight Tools states "one of our core values is giving back to the great communities where we live, work and serve. With respect and humility, we strive to support and strengthen communities, big and small, across the United States." The company supports K-12 education, veterans, and police and fire organizations with donations and gifts of tools and equipment.

On January 9, 2013, CEO Eric Smidt, through Harbor Freight Tools, donated $1.4 million of tools and equipment to the Los Angeles Unified School District's (LAUSD) Career Technical Education. The donation was presented to LAUSD Board President Monica Garcia and Executive Director Michael Romero at the East Los Angeles Skills Center and Occupational Center in front of an assembly.

Later in the same year, Harbor Freight Tools expanded its Tools for Schools program by donating a $100,000 gift of tools and equipment to South Carolina schools.

In 2016, Eric Smidt formed The Smidt Foundation to house Harbor Freight Tools for Schools and support other education, health, safety, and community needs. The Harbor Freight Tools for Schools Prize for Teaching Excellence awards more than $1 million annually to skilled trades teachers and their schools.

In February 2018, Cedars-Sinai announced a $50 million gift from Eric and Susan Smidt and The Smidt Foundation to create the Smidt Heart Institute.

In March 2020, in response to the COVID-19 pandemic, Harbor Freight Tools committed to donate its entire supply of N95 masks, face shields, and nitrile gloves to U.S. hospitals which had a 24-hour emergency room.

Criticism and legal action 
Harbor Freight Tools was sued by a group of its store employees in 2012, who alleged that they were misclassified as "exempt" from overtime payments as "managers" under the Fair Labor Standards Act. Harbor Freight Tools won a declassification of the class action; that is, the court found that all the individual situations were not similar enough to be judged as a single class, and that their claims would require an individual-by-individual inquiry, so the case could not be handled on a class basis.

In 2015, a class action lawsuit was filed against the company by customers, claiming that the tool company falsely advertised "normal" prices for products that were higher than an advertised "sale" price, when the item had never been offered at the original, higher price. Consumers claimed that this practice misled them into thinking that the item was on sale and they were getting a deal. The company settled, paying consumers up to $33,000,000.

References

External links 
www.harborfreight.com — Harbor Freight Tools official site

Companies based in Calabasas, California
Home improvement retailers of the United States
Retail companies established in 1977
1977 establishments in California